Boucher-Neuhäuser syndrome is a very rare genetic disorder which is characterized by a triad consisting of cerebellar ataxia, chorioretinal dystrophy, and hypogonadism.

Signs and symptoms 

The symptoms have already been mentioned above, this section will be used to denote the onset of these symptoms: The cerebellar ataxia associated with this syndrome often appears in adolescence-early adulthood, chorioretinal dystrophy usually appears between the age of 50 and 60 years old, and the hypogonadotropic hypogonadism appears in late childhood-adolescence.

Causes 

This disorder is caused by autosomal recessive mutations in the PNPLA6 gene, in chromosome 19.

Epidemiology 

Only 22 cases have been described in medical literature (excluding the cases which were not first reported to be part of the syndrome, which were approximately 19 cases).

References 

Autosomal recessive disorders
Genetic diseases and disorders